James Popple (born 1964) is
CEO of the Law Council of Australia.
He is also
an Honorary Professor in the College of Law and the College of Engineering and Computer Science at the Australian National University,
and a Fellow of the Australian Academy of Law.

He was
President of the ANU's Postgraduate and Research Students' Association (1990–91);
associate to High Court Justice Mary Gaudron (1995);
Deputy Registrar of the High Court of Australia (1996–98);
a senior executive in the Australian Attorney-General's Department (1998–2010);
the first Australian Freedom of Information Commissioner (2010–14);
a Senior Member of the Administrative Appeals Tribunal (2015–17);
a Principal Reviewer at CPM Reviews Pty Ltd (2018);
a member of the Australian Anti-Dumping Review Panel (2018–21);
a member of the ACT Remuneration Tribunal (2018–22);
Official Secretary to the Royal Commission into Aged Care Quality and Safety (2018–21);
and Official Secretary to the Royal Commission into Defence and Veteran Suicide (2021–22).

He has been a member of the Council of Burgmann College, ANU since 1985.

As part of his PhD research at the ANU (1993), he developed a legal expert system called SHYSTER.

References

External links
 : 
 : 
 
 
 
 

1964 births
Living people
People from Victoria (Australia)
20th-century Australian lawyers
21st-century Australian lawyers
Fellows of the Australian Academy of Law
Australian computer scientists
Artificial intelligence researchers
Australian public servants
Australian chief executives
Australian National University alumni
Academic staff of the Australian National University